is a Japanese manga series by noho. It originally began serialization online via Twitter in August 2017. It has been then serialized via East Press' Mato Grosso website since July 2018 and has been collected in four tankōbon volumes. An anime adaptation has been announced.

Media

Manga

Anime
An anime adaptation was announced on the fourth volume of the manga on April 7, 2022.

References

External links
 Tonari no Yōkai-san at Mato Grosso 
 

Anime series based on manga
Japanese webcomics
Seinen manga
Supernatural anime and manga
Yōkai in anime and manga
Webcomics in print